The 1939 Minnesota Golden Gophers football team represented the University of Minnesota in the 1939 Big Ten Conference football season. In their eighth year under head coach Bernie Bierman, the Golden Gophers compiled a 3–4–1 record and outscored their opponents by a combined total of 154 to 82.

Tackle Win Pederson was named All-Big Ten first team. Halfback Hal Van Every was awarded the Team MVP Award.

Total attendance for the season was 229,954, which averaged to 45,991. The season high for attendance was against Northwestern.

Schedule

Game summaries

Michigan

On November 11, 1939, Minnesota defeated Michigan by a 20 to 7 score. The game was the 30th between the programs, with Minnesota having won the previous five games under head coach Bernie Bierman. Minnesota jumped to a 20 to 0 lead with touchdowns in the first, third and fourth quarters. Minnesota's touchdown in the third quarter came on a 59-yard run by halfback George Franck. In the fourth quarter, Michigan finally scored on touchdown pass from Tom Harmon to Paul Kromer. Harmon kicked for the PAT.

Michigan's starting lineup against Minnesota was Joe Rogers (left end), Roland Savilla (left tackle), Ralph Fritz (left guard), Archie Kodros (center), Milo Sukup (right guard), William Smith (right tackle), John Nicholson (right end), Ingalls (quarterback), Paul Kromer (left halfback), Harmon (right halfback), and Bob Westfall (fullback).

References

Minnesota
Minnesota Golden Gophers football seasons
Minnesota Golden Gophers football